Denis Patry (born December 5, 1953) is a Canadian retired ice hockey player who played three games in the World Hockey Association for the Quebec Nordiques.

Patry was born in Asbestos, Quebec and raised in Drummondville, Quebec. He played junior hockey for the Drummondville Rangers from 1969 to 1973. As a youth, he played in the 1965 and 1966 Quebec International Pee-Wee Hockey Tournaments with a minor ice hockey team from Asbestos.

Career statistics

References

External links
 

1953 births
Living people
Canadian ice hockey forwards
Drummondville Rangers players
Sportspeople from Drummondville
Maine Nordiques players
Montreal Canadiens draft picks
People from Val-des-Sources
Philadelphia Firebirds (NAHL) players
Quebec Nordiques (WHA) draft picks
Quebec Nordiques (WHA) players
Ice hockey people from Quebec